Japan sent competitors to the 2018 Winter Paralympics in Pyeongchang, South Korea.  The group from Japan competed in para-alpine skiing, para-Nordic skiing, para-snowboarding and sledge hockey.

Medalists

The following Japanese competitors won medals at the games. In the discipline sections below, the medalists' names are bolded.

Team 
There were three announcements with who would go to the 2018 Winter Games representing Japan.  The second announcement was made on 8 February 2018.  The last announcement was made on 18 February 2018.  The last announcement said two male para-alpine skiers would be going to South Korea. The country has the third largest team among all nations.  It has 38 people.

The table below contains the list of members of people (called "Team Japan") that will be participating in the 2018 Games.

Para-Nordic skiing

Skiers 
Keiichi Sato competes in two sports: para-triathlon and para-Nordic skiing.  The first sport he did was para-Nordic skiing.  As a member of Team Japan, he went to the 2010 and 2014 Winter Paralympics.  After para-triathlon became a Paralympic sport, Sato decided to try it.  He then was part of Team Japan at the 2016 Summer Paralympics. He then went to the 2017 Triathlon World Championships.  After that, he stopped competing in para-triathlon.  He wanted to try to medal at the 2018 Winter Paralympics.  He thought he needed to focus on para-Nordic skiing to do that.

Schedule and results 
On 12 March, the 15 km race takes place, with standing and vision impaired women starting at 10:00 PM.  Thee sprint classic qualification takes place on 14 March from 10:00 AM – 11:25 AM for both men and women in all classes. It is followed in the afternoon by the semifinals and finals.  The classic race takes place on 17 March. The standing and visually impaired women's race takes place from 10:00 AM - 12:30.

Para-snowboarding

Snowboarders 
Atsushi Yamamoto is a track and field competitor.  He won a silver medal in the men's T42 long jump at the 2016 Summer Paralympics.  In November 2017, he went to the World Para Snowboard World Cup in Landgraaf, Netherlands.  The World Cup was his first para-snowboarding competition.  Also there was Daniel Wagner of Denmark.  Wagner won gold in the event which Yamamoto won silver.  Both men had decided to compete internationally in snowboarding during the same year.

Schedule and results 
The snowboard cross event starts on 12 March.  It goesfrom 10:30 AM to 5:00 PM for all classes for both men and women. The slalom race is scheduled to take place on 16 March, going from 10:30 AM – 4:55 PM for men and women in all classes.

Para ice hockey

Summary

Mixed Tournament

Roster 

Japan's team has 17 men. Their coach is Kojin Nakakita.

Qualification 

Japan, Sweden and the Czech Republic were the last 3 teams that were able to go to the 2018 Games. They could go because of how they finished at the Qualification Tournament in October in Ostersund, Sweden in October 2017.

Preliminary round

5–8th place semifinal

Seventh place game

Media and television 
For the first time, the Paralympic Games will be live on television.  The 2018 Games will be on NHK. People can watch on NHK General TV and NHK Educational TV channels. Some will be televised with a resolution of 8K.  There are going to be 62 hours of live coverage.

References 

2018
Nations at the 2018 Winter Paralympics
2018 in Japanese sport